Tamin is a genus of Indonesian long-legged sac spiders first described by Christa Deeleman-Reinhold in 2001.  it contains only two species.

References

External links

Araneomorphae genera
Miturgidae